Balflare is a Japanese power metal band formed in 2004.

Biography
Balflare  was formed in 2004 by guitarist Syuta Hashimoto and vocalist Hideki Tada. Together, they began recording a demo, Sound of Silence. During the recording of this demo, drummer Isao Matsuzaki and bassist Takashi Odaira joined the band. The demo was largely well received in Japan and their career was launched.

In 2005 they released their first full-length album Thousands of Winters of Flames through Hidden Maniacs. Following the release, a second guitarist was recruited, Leo Yabumoto, in order to reproduce the twin guitar leads live. After a couple of gigs in Japan, vocalist Hideki Tada left for private reasons. Eijin Kawazoe was recruited as the new vocalist.

They continued playing several successful gigs, and started recording their second full length in August, 2005. During this time they recorded the song "Out Break" for the SAMURAI METAL Vol. 1 compilation album.

In 2006 they released the album Tempest on July 26 through Soundholic. Their third album Sleeping Hollow was released on April 23, 2008. On September 28, 2012, they released their fourth album, Downpour.

Line-up

Current members
 Eijin Kawazoe - vocals
 Ayuko Hayano - keyboards
 Isao Matsuzaki - drums
 Leo Yabumoto - guitar
 Syuta Hashimoto - guitar and keyboards
 Takashi Odaira - bass

Former members
 Hideki Tada - vocals

Discography

Demos
 Sound of Silence (January 2004) - Self-released.

Albums
 Thousands of Winters of Flames (March 23, 2005) - Hidden Maniacs
 Tempest (July 26, 2006) - Soundholic
 Sleeping Hollow (April 23, 2008) - Soundholic
 Downpour (September 28, 2012) - Black-Listed Records

Compilation Contributions
 "Out Break" on SAMURAI METAL Vol. 1

References

External links
 Official site

Japanese power metal musical groups
Musical groups established in 2004
Musical groups from Tokyo